The Gilded Cage is a 1916 silent film drama directed by Harley Knowles and starring Alice Brady.

This film is preserved at the Library of Congress, Packard Campus for Audio-Visual Conservation.

Cast
Alice Brady - Princess Honore
Alec B. Francis - King Comus
Gerda Holmes - Queen Vesta
Montagu Love - Baron Stefano
Arthur Ashley - Capt. Kassari
Sidney D'Albrook - Nickolai
Clara Whipple - Lesbia the Goose Girl
Irving Cummings - Prince Boris

References

External links
 The Gilded Cage at IMDb.com

1916 films
American silent feature films
American black-and-white films
Silent American drama films
World Film Company films
1916 drama films
Films with screenplays by Frances Marion
Surviving American silent films
1910s American films